Livin' Lovin' Rockin' Rollin': The 25th Anniversary Collection is a three-disc box set chronicling the career of country music band Alabama. It contains 51 tracks, dating from their earliest days as a recording act in 1973 through September 2000.

The box set was issued to commemorate Alabama's 25 years of national fame, even though their first national hit was released in 1977 and their first major hit came in 1980. During that time, Alabama had sold millions of albums, won countless awards from the Country Music Association and Academy of Country Music, and had had a major influence in both bringing groups and bands into the country music mainstream and in the styles of later successful groups, including Lonestar and Rascal Flatts.

Many of the songs on this collection are of Alabama's biggest hits, including a majority of their 32 No. 1 songs (as determined by Billboard magazine'''s Hot Country Singles & Tracks chart). However, as Allmusic reviewer Stephen Thomas Erlewine pointed out, The 25th Anniversary Collection was intended "as an aural biography of a band". Several of the hit titles are presented here either as live concert recordings or taken from alternate takes.[]

In addition to the three compact discs, The 25th Anniversary Collection'' includes a booklet containing photographs, a biography by Nashville journalist Robert K. Oermann and comments from band members.

Track listing

Disc 1
 "My Home's in Alabama" (Teddy Gentry, Randy Owen) — 8:20C
 "40 Hour Week (For a Livin')" (Dave Loggins, Don Schlitz, Lisa Silver) — 3:24
 "Medley: That Silver-Haired Daddy of Mine / Suppertime / Teach Your Children / Don't It Make You Want to Go Home" (Gene Autry, Jimmy Long / Ira Stanphill / Graham Nash / Joe South) — 7:09AC
 "High Cotton" (Scott Anders, Roger Murrah) — 3:01
 "Mountain Music" (Owen) — 4:13
 "Dixieland Delight" (Ronnie Rogers) — 5:18C
 "Caroline Mountain Dewe" (Owen) — 4:25
 "Roll On (Eighteen Wheeler)" (Loggins) — 4:26
 "If You're Gonna Play in Texas (You Gotta Have a Fiddle in the Band)" (Murry Kellum, Dan Mitchell) — 3:42C
 "Christmas in Dixie" (Jeff Cook, Gentry, Mark Herndon, Owen) — 3:42
 "I Write a Little" (Cook, Owen, Rogers) — 4:18
 "Song of the South" (Bob McDill) — 3:11
 "Pass It On Down" (Gentry, Owen, Will Robinson, Rogers) — 4:54
 "Five O'Clock 500" (Gentry, Owen, Rogers) — 3:38
 "Tar Top" (Owen) — 5:23AC
 "Dancin', Shaggin' on the Boulevard" (Greg Fowler, Gentry, Owen) — 4:43

Disc 2
 "Feels So Right" (Owen) — 3:37
 "Old Flame" (Donny Lowery, Mac McAnally) — 3:12
 "Lady Down on Love" (Owen) — 3:58
 "Very Special Love" (Gentry, Owen) — 4:45
 "Close Enough to Perfect" (Carl Chambers) — 3:34
 "Take Me Down" (Mark Gray, J.P. Pennington) — 4:53
 "Medley: Deep River Woman / When We Make Love" (Lionel Richie / Troy Seals, Mentor Williams) — 4:21AC
 "Face to Face" (alternate take) (Owen) — 3:03A
 "'You've Got' the Touch" (John Jarrard, Lisa Palas, Robinson) — 4:16
 "You Turn Me On" (Gentry, Owen) — 3:10
 "Forever's as Far as I'll Go" (Mike Reid) — 3:37
 "How Do You Fall in Love" (Fowler, Gentry, Owen) — 3:00
 "I Just Couldn't Say No" (Fowler, Gentry, Owen) — 4:35
 "Too Much Love" (Fowler, Owen) — 3:57
 "If I Had You" (Chater, Mayo) — 3:35
 "The Woman He Loves" (Seals, Setser) — 3:55
 "God Must Have Spent a Little More Time on You" (Rogers, Sturken) — 4:41
 "Angels Among Us" (Vocal Remix) (Don Goodman, Becky Hobbs) — 4:07

Disc 3
 "Tennessee River" (Owen) — 7:53C
 "Vacation" (Owen) — 5:19AC
 "She and I" (Loggins) — 5:17
 "Sad Lookin' Moon" (Fowler, Gentry, Owen) — 3:33
 "Give Me One More Shot" (Gentry, Owen, Rogers) — 3:32
 "Fallin' Again" (Fowler, Gentry, Owen) — 4:00B
 "I'm in a Hurry (And Don't Know Why)" (Murrah, Randy Van Warmer) — 2:49
 "Can't Keep a Good Man Down" (Bob Corbin) — 3:45C
 "If It Ain't Dixie (It Won't Do)" (Jarrard, Robbins) — 6:42AC
 "The Cheap Seats" (Hummon, Sharp) — 3:54
 "Gonna Have a Party" (Channel, Cochran, Kane) — 4:59AC
 "When It All Goes South" (Carnes, Carnes, Jarvis) — 6:57
 "Down Home" (Bowles, Leo) — 3:29
 "Born Country" (Byron Hill, John Schweers) — 3:18
 "Ripperly O' Tucke" (demo) (Owen) — 3:21A
 "Hats Off" (Fowler, Gentry, Owen, Rogers) — 3:56
 "The Fans" (Fowler, Gentry, Owen) — 4:53

A Previously unreleased.
B Single edit.
C Live recording.

Personnel

Alabama
Jeff Cook- fiddle, electric guitar, vocals
Teddy Gentry- bass guitar, vocals
Mark Herndon- drums, percussion
Randy Owen- lead vocals, background vocals

Additional Musicians
Mark Casstevens- acoustic guitar
Don Cook- background vocals
Debbie Datz Pyle- string contractor
Steve Dorff- conductor, string arrangements
Larry Franklin- fiddle
John Barlow Jarvis- Hammond B-3 organ, piano
Brent Mason- 6-string bass guitar, 12-string electric guitar, electric guitar, gut string guitar
The Music Team- string contractors
Steve Nathan- keyboards
Lonnie Wilson- drums, percussion

Chart performance

References

Alabama (band) compilation albums
2006 compilation albums
RCA Records compilation albums